Wängle is a municipality in the district of Reutte in the Austrian state of Tyrol.  Its St. Martin church contains many frescoes and paintings by Paul Zeiler.

Geography
Wängle lies west of Reutte at the foot of a ski and hiking area.

References

Cities and towns in Reutte District